The 1929–30 season was the 25th year of football played by Dundee United, and covers the period from 1 July 1929 to 30 June 1930.

Match results
Dundee United played a total of 40 matches during the 1929–30 season.

Legend

All results are written with Dundee United's score first.
Own goals in italics

First Division

Scottish Cup

References

Dundee United F.C. seasons
Dundee United